Judgement of Solomon is a tempera on canvas painting of the Judgement of Solomon attributed to Andrea Mantegna and his collaborators. Dating to around c.1495, the painting is now in the Louvre, 

Judgement imitates a marble bas-relief.  The only surviving preparatory drawing may be in Mantegna's own hand.

Bibliography
  Mauro Lucco (ed), Mantegna a Mantova 1460-1506, catalogo della mostra, Skira Milano, 2006.

External links 

Paintings by Andrea Mantegna
1460 paintings
Paintings in the Louvre by Italian artists
Mantegna